Shamil Afandiyev (born 13 October 1972) is an Azerbaijani wrestler. He competed in the men's freestyle 63 kg at the 2000 Summer Olympics.

References

External links

1972 births
Living people
Azerbaijani male sport wrestlers
Olympic wrestlers of Azerbaijan
Wrestlers at the 2000 Summer Olympics
Place of birth missing (living people)
21st-century Azerbaijani people